Ana María Josefa Ramona Juana Nepomucena Marcelina Huarte y Muñiz (17 January 178621 March 1861) was the first Empress of Mexico. Noted for her beauty, grace and education, she married Agustín de Iturbide who ruled briefly as Emperor in 1822-23, before being exiled by the short-lived provisional government. Tempted back to Mexico to regain power, he was arrested and executed. The Empress lived out her widowhood mostly in the United States.

Biography
Ana Maria was born on 17 January 1786, in the Mexican city of Valladolid (present-day Morelia), considered by scholars of that time as "The Garden of New Spain". Her father was Isidro Huarte, who in the second half of the 18th century had immigrated from Goizueta, Navarre for better opportunities and amassed a huge fortune. Her mother, Doña Ana Manuela Muñiz y Sánchez de Tagle was Isidro Huarte's second wife. Ana Manuela belonged to one of New Spain's richest and most influential families, the House of Tagle, the family of the Marquises of Altamira. Her great great grandfather was the brother of Don Luis Sánchez de Tagle, 1st Marquis of Altamira.

Ana Maria was baptized at Sagrario Metropolitano de Valladolid at the same year she was born. Later, she attended Colegio Santa Rosa María de Valladolid, which was known for its educational and musical excellence. Ana Maria distinguished herself as an excellent student and was also gifted with musical talents.

Marriage and family
Ana Maria possessed great beauty with features likened to that of the Madonna. She showed gracious, exquisite manners while in Colegio Santa Rosa Maria, and it was in this school where she met the young Agustin de Iturbide. The young Agustin was considered very handsome and came from a very wealthy Basque noble family. Their marriage was considered by many as a perfect match.

On a Friday afternoon, 27 February 1805, at one o'clock, the 19-year-old Ana Maria married the 22-year-old Agustin de Iturbide. Ana Maria arrived in the Cathedral of Valladolid dressed as an Austrian princess, adorned with white lace and fringed combs. Their wedding was a great social event, as women wore their best jewels and sumptuous dresses, while men were dressed in strict formal attire.

Ana María provided a dowry of one hundred thousand pesos, with which the couple bought a hacienda in the town of Maravatío.

Together they had 10 children:

Agustín Jerónimo de Iturbide y Huarte, Prince Imperial of Mexico (1807–1866) father of Jesusa de Iturbide Fernández
Sabina de Iturbide y Huarte (1809–1871)
Juana de Iturbide y Huarte (1811–1828)
Josefa de Iturbide y Huarte (1814–1891)
Ángel de Iturbide y Huarte (1816–1872) father of Agustín de Iturbide y Green
María de Iturbide y Huarte (1818–1849)
Dolores de Iturbide y Huarte (1819–1820)
Salvador de Iturbide y Huarte (1820–1856) father of Salvador de Iturbide y de Marzán
Felipe de Iturbide y Huarte (1822–1853)
Agustín Cosme de Iturbide y Huarte (1824–1873)

Empress consort
Agustín de Iturbide's coronation was held at the Mexico City Cathedral on 21 July 1822, Ana María was crowned Empress, in an elaborate ceremony.  It was attended by the bishops of Puebla, Guadalajara, Durango and Oaxaca and presided over by Archbishop of Mexico Fonte.

After the coronation, the couple lived at the 18th-century palace of the Marquis of San Mateo Valparaiso along with the sum of one and half million pesos for expenses. Empress Ana Maria was accompanied by a leading lady, seven ladies-in-waiting, nine honorary ladies, seven ladies of the chamber, ladies in charge of her wardrobe, and a personal doctor, while her children were given guardians, tutors and governesses.

When the problem within the Mexican Empire started, the Empress and her children took refuge in the convent. She soon joined her husband into exile when he abdicated the throne on 19 March 1823. The Imperial family was accompanied by their loyal subjects and was escorted by Gen. Nicolas Bravo. The family sailed on a ship filled with food, wine, jewelry and artwork until they finally reached Italy. Ferdinand III, Grand Duke of Tuscany allowed the Imperial family to stay in Livorno, where they rented a small country house. But then, the King of Spain pressured the Grand Duke of Tuscany to expel the Imperial family, and so, the Empress and her family left for London.

Her husband, the former Emperor, continued to receive reports from Mexico as well as advice from supporters that if he returned he would be hailed as a liberator and a potential leader against the Spanish invasion. Iturbide sent word to Congress in Mexico City on 13 February 1824 offering his services in the event of Spanish attack. Congress never replied. More conservative political factions in Mexico finally convinced Iturbide to return. Accompanied by his wife, two children, and a chaplain (Joseph A. Lopez), Agustin de Iturbide landed at the port of Soto la Marina in Mexico on 14 July 1824, where he was arrested and later executed by a firing squad on 19 July 1824. Ana Maria was pregnant with their youngest child at this time.

The Mexican Congress allowed the Empress and her children go to the Gran Colombia and granted the family an annual pension of 8,000 pesos. But there was no ship to take them. The family instead found a ship sailing to the United States. Ana Maria gave birth to her tenth child in New Orleans. The family later resided in Baltimore and then settled in a small house in Georgetown, just outside Washington. The former Empress, along with two of her daughters, were finally settled in Philadelphia, while the other children continued their studies in various places. 

In 1847, the Mexican Government stopped providing her the pension befitting a former Empress. She was received by U.S. President James K. Polk in the White House as she sought help from the U.S. government about her Mexican pension.

Empress Ana Maria donated several portraits and family memorabilia of the exiled Imperial family to a convent, such as a crown of woven material made out of gold and silver. She experienced the pain of the death of two of her daughters, as well as the marriage of her sons Salvador and Angel. The Empress never approved of the marriage of her son Angel to Alice Green, the American great-granddaughter of George Plater, Governor of Maryland.

Death
On the night of Thursday, 21 March 1861, at 75 years old, Ana Maria Josefa Ramona de Huarte de Iturbide y Muñiz, the former Empress of Mexico, died at her residence in Philadelphia. She was buried in Vault IX in the cemetery at the Church of St. John the Evangelist, where she had been a parishioner for decades.

The service was very simple. No former associates of this noblewoman, born to one of Mexico’s most aristocratic families and who once wore the Mexican crown, gave their final respects. A few men in Philadelphia, whose high social position had acquainted them with the former Imperial family, attended the funeral. Only one in ten thousand of Philadelphia's residents knew that the woman laid there to rest was briefly an Empress.

Decree 
The Sovereign Mexican Constituent Congress decreed on 22 June 1822 the following:

Art 1 °. The Mexican Monarchy, in addition to being moderate and Constitutional, is also hereditary.
Art 2 °. Consequently, the Nation calls the succession of the Crown for the death of the current Emperor, his firstborn son Don Agustín Jerónimo de Iturbide. The Constitution of the Empire will decide the order of succession of the throne.
Art 3 °. The crown prince will be called "Prince Imperial" and will have the treatment of Imperial Highness.
Art 4 °. The legitimate sons and daughters of H.I.M will be called "Mexican Princes", and will have the treatment of Highness.
Art 5 °. Don José Joaquín de Iturbide y Arreguí, Father of H.I.M, is decorated with the title of "Prince of the Union" and the treatment of Highness, during his life.
Art 6 °. It is also granted the title of "Princess of Iturbide" and the treatment of Highness, during his life, to Doña María Nicolasa de Iturbide y Arámburo, sister of the Emperor.

Arms

Ancestry

References

|-

|-

Ana Maria de Huarte y Muniz
Independent Mexico
History of Mexico
1786 births
1861 deaths
People from Morelia
19th-century Mexican people
19th-century Mexican women